Franco Lodato is an Italian -American industrial designer, best known for his work in biomimicry. Lodato has served as an associate professor at the University of Montreal School of Design, designer in residence at the University of South Florida, and as a visiting lecturer at the MIT Media Laboratory. He is the vice president of the Industrial Designers Society of America (IDSA), Florida Chapter. Lodato has an honorary doctorate from Universidad Nueva Esparta.

Lodato served as the managing director for the Americas Operation for Pininfarina, a leading design service for automotive, luxury lifestyle, consumer electronics, and technology industries, where he was  instrumental part of the team that developed the Maserati Birdcage 75th. His corporate work assignments and consulting career includes research and design for leading global enterprises such as Gillette, Herman Miller, DuPont, Coca-Cola, Ferrari-Maserati, Boeing, Bombardier, Challenger Powerboats, and as a Master Innovator, in Wearable technology for Google-Motorola and VSN Mobil, Inc.

At VSN Mobil, Lodato has created, developed and implemented a product platform strategy for wearable technology in the areas of Biometrics health, sensing and monitoring, sports dynamics and telecommunications.

At Motorola, Lodato developed Android Smartphones and Tablet computers, Wi-Fi, 4G, Push-to-talk, and customized hardware solutions utilizing CDMA, UMTS, and IDEN standards. He established new partnerships and licensing agreements with Ferrari, Gucci, Karpersky, Lamborghini, Amazon, T-Mobile, Sprint, Bertone, and Pininfarina. Established technology research and development collaborations with major U.S. and international universities including, MIT, University of Florida, Tufts University, Carnegie Mellon University, Florida Atlantic University, RIT, McGill University, Stanford University, Ringling College of Art and Design, Duke University, Pennsylvania State University, Istituto Europeo di Design, Politecnicco di Milano, and IED Torino.

Lodato was founder of the pre-engineering program at American Heritage School Plantation and an instructor in the program from 2007 to 2015.  he is SVP Design & Innovation for Kids2, one of the fastest growing baby product companies in the world. Lodato holds 57 U.S. and 14 international implementation and design patents  and is an executive member of the National Academy of Inventors.

Lodato designed the seal for the National Academy of Inventors, an "arrow that girdles the globe, representing the idea that 'innovation moves the world.'".

Bibliography

References

External links
BioDesign: The Nature of Design by Franco Lodato from MIT Media Laboratory
What Woodpeckers, Sharks and Snakes Teach Us About Design | Franco Lodato | TEDxBend, 2016

1962 births
Living people
American industrial designers
Industrial designers